Lindol may refer to:

Luisito Espinosa (born 1967), nicknamed "Lindol", retired Filipino boxer
"Lindol", an episode of Tadhana
"Lindol", an episode of Paradise Island

See also 
List of earthquakes in the Philippines